The Souapiti Hydropower Station, also known as Souapiti Hydropower Project or Souapiti Hydropower Plant, is a water conservancy project in the Republic of Guinea,  located on the Konkoure River,  with a total installed capacity of 550 MW. This project was constructed by China International Water & Electric Corporation (CWE).  The generating station is expected to cost about $2 billion.

History
The groundbreaking ceremony for the Souapiti Hydropower Station was held on December 22, 2015.

The hydropower plant is scheduled to be completed and put into operation in 2021.

References 

Energy in Africa
Hydroelectric power stations in Africa
Hydroelectric power stations in Guinea